Lamplughsaura is a genus of sauropodomorph dinosaur from the Sinemurian-age (Early Jurassic) Dharmaram Formation of India, dating  from  between 196 and 190 million years ago. The type and only species is  Lamplughsaura dharmaramensis. It is known from several partial skeletons of a large quadrupedal animal up to 10 meters (33 ft) long, and was either a basal sauropod or, less likely, a more basal sauropodomorph.

It was named after Pamela Lamplugh, founder of the Indian Statistical Institute.

References

Sauropodomorphs
Dinosaurs of India and Madagascar
Early Jurassic dinosaurs of Asia
Sinemurian life
Fossils of India
Fossil taxa described in 2007
Taxa named by Sankar Chatterjee
Taxa named by Peter Galton